Chiyoto Nakano (born 7 February 1913, date of death unknown) was a Japanese boxer who competed in the 1936 Summer Olympics. In 1936 he was eliminated in the second round of the flyweight class after losing his fight to Alfredo Carlomagno.

1936 Olympic results
 Round of 32: bye
 Round of 16: lost to Alfredo Carlomagno (Argentina) by decision

External links
profile
 

1913 births
Year of death missing
Flyweight boxers
Olympic boxers of Japan
Boxers at the 1936 Summer Olympics
Japanese male boxers